Pooh's Grand Adventure: The Search for Christopher Robin (also known as Winnie the Pooh's Most Grand Adventure in some countries) is a 1997 American direct-to-video animated adventure comedy-drama film co-written, co-produced, and directed by Karl Geurs. The film follows Pooh and his friends on a journey to find and rescue their friend Christopher Robin from the "skull". Along the way, the group confront their own insecurities throughout the search, facing and conquering them in a series of events where they are forced to act beyond their own known limits, thus discovering their true potential. Unlike the film's predecessors, this film is an entirely original story, not based on any of A. A. Milne's classic stories (although some elements derive from "In Which Rabbit Has a Busy Day and We Learn What Christopher Robin Does in the Mornings" and "In Which Christopher Robin and Pooh Come to an Enchanted Place and We Leave Them There" from The House at Pooh Corner).

Plot
Once upon the last day of a golden summer, Christopher Robin attempts to tell his friend Winnie-the-Pooh some sad news, but Pooh is uninterested and continuously changes the subject until Christopher Robin forgets about it. After spending the day playing, Christopher Robin leaves Pooh with the quote, "You're braver than you believe, and stronger than you seem, and smarter than you think," but the drowsy Pooh does not understand the sentiment. Autumn arrives the next morning, and Pooh awakes to find a pot of honey at his doorstep, failing to notice a note attached to it. Pooh searches for Christopher Robin to ask who the pot's for, but discovers that he is missing. Pooh's friends – Piglet, Tigger, Rabbit, and Eeyore – have not seen Christopher Robin either and cannot decipher the note attached to the pot as it has been smeared in honey, so they go to Owl for advice. Although he is able to remove some of the honey from the note, Owl misinterprets it as a request for help from Christopher Robin. Further, mispronouncing the word "school" as "skull", he deduces that Christopher Robin has been taken to a distant and dangerous place called "Skull", a cave where the monstrous "Skullasaurus" resides. Owl equips the group with a map and sends them into the "Great Unknown" of the Hundred Acre Wood.

Throughout their journey through the Great Unknown, the group hears strange noises behind them, which they assume is the Skullasaurus. The group slowly begins to realize just how helpless they are without Christopher Robin in the outside world. Piglet, Tigger, and Rabbit come to believe they do not have the courage, strength, or intelligence respectively to go on; Piglet is abducted by a swarm of playful butterflies in a tranquil field, leaving him feeling terrified and useless, Tigger falls into a deep gorge and is unable to bounce out to safety, eventually causing the others to dive in with him, and Rabbit continuously makes bad leadership decisions following Owl's inaccurate map. Pooh tries to comfort them each with the advice Christopher Robin had given him, but fails due to his inability to remember exactly what he said. When Rabbit finally breaks down and admits he has no idea where they are going, the group comes to terms with their failure and sulk in a nearby cave. While everyone is asleep, Pooh privately laments on the pain he experiences from losing Christopher Robin.

The next morning, the five friends realize they had spent the night in the Skull Cave. The group enters and splits up to find Christopher Robin; when Rabbit, Tigger, Piglet, and Eeyore eventually reunite, they are scared away by Pooh's distorted reflection as he walks towards them from behind a crystal wall, mistaking him for the Skullasaurus. As Pooh winds up stuck in a small crevasse, his friends believe that he has been eaten. They discover the "Eye of the Skull" where Christopher Robin is supposedly trapped, and overcome their fears and doubts to reach it. Observing his friends' teamwork, Pooh excitedly frees himself from the tight gap, only to slip down a long descent and fall into a deep pit that he is unable to escape. While there, he realizes that Christopher Robin is still with him in his heart, even when they are not together, just as Christopher Robin had promised. As Piglet, Rabbit, Tigger, and Eeyore enter the Eye, they are found by Christopher Robin, who has been searching for them as well. He clears up Owl's misunderstanding of the note, explaining that he wanted Pooh to "help [him]self" to the honey pot he gave him and that he was really at school (which is what Christopher Robin tried to tell Pooh earlier). The roars of the supposed Skullasaurus they have been plagued by were actually the noises of Pooh's stomach growling, and Christopher Robin rescues Pooh from the pit(with the honey pot being left behind).

The group exits the cave, only to discover that from the outside, it and the other places they have crossed are not nearly as big and scary as they seemed when Christopher Robin was not with them (in reality, they were all just illusions created by their fears and loneliness). That evening after the group returns home, Christopher Robin says he will be returning to school the next day, but Pooh declares that he will always be waiting for him, and the two happily watch the sunset, knowing they will always have each other in the sanctuary of the Hundred Acre Wood.

Cast
 Jim Cummings as Winnie the Pooh and The Skullasaurus.
 John Fiedler as Piglet
 Steve Schatzberg as Piglet's singing voice 
 Peter Cullen as Eeyore
 Paul Winchell as Tigger.
 Jim Cummings as Tigger's singing voice
 Ken Sansom as Rabbit
 Brady Bluhm as Christopher Robin
 Frankie J. Galasso as Christopher Robin's singing voice
 Andre Stojka as Owl
 David Warner as The Narrator

Reception
Review aggregation website Rotten Tomatoes assessed an approval rating of 33% based on 9 reviews and an average score of 4.3/10.

George Blooston of Entertainment Weekly gave the film a C grade, calling it "treacly" and criticized its lack of "grown up-wit [and] child psychology" from The Many Adventures of Winnie the Pooh. David Nusair of Reel Film Reviews called the film "tedious", and Alex Sandell of Juicy Cerebellum felt that Disney "always sucked with Pooh."

Jane Louise Boursaw of Kaboose praised the film's songwriting and animation. Gene Siskel and Roger Ebert gave the film "two thumbs up" on their review show as well.

Home video
The film was released on VHS in the United States on August 5, 1997. It was later issued on VHS in the United Kingdom on October 13, 1997. The 1997 VHS release has the Walt Disney Masterpiece Collection logo, despite being a direct-to-video film.

It was released for the first time on "Special Edition" DVD in 2006, with digitally remastered picture and sound quality. It includes a featurette "Pooh's Symphony" and the 1968 film, Winnie the Pooh and the Blustery Day.

The film, alongside Piglet's Big Movie, was released on Blu-ray for the first time as a Disney Movie Club exclusive on July 17, 2018 to coincide with its belated 20th anniversary and the live-action Christopher Robin film, released over two weeks later.

Elements of the plot – such as the skull, and the mis-read map – were used in the 2001 videogame Party Time with Winnie the Pooh.

Sources
The film's plot is based primarily on two A. A. Milne stories from The House at Pooh Corner: "In which Rabbit has a busy day and we learn what Christopher Robin does in the mornings," and "In which Christopher Robin and Pooh come to an Enchanted Place and we leave them there".

Songs

See also
 The Many Adventures of Winnie the Pooh

References

External links

 
 
 
 Pooh's Grand Adventure DVD Review and Pictures at UltimateDisney.com

1997 animated films
1997 films
1997 direct-to-video films
1990s adventure comedy films
1990s American animated films
1990s fantasy adventure films
1997 children's films
1997 musical films
American adventure comedy films
American children's animated adventure films
American children's animated comedy films
American children's animated fantasy films
American children's animated musical films
American musical fantasy films
Direct-to-video sequel films
Disney direct-to-video animated films
Winnie the Pooh (franchise)
DisneyToon Studios animated films
Japanese animated films
Winnie-the-Pooh films
Disney Television Animation films
Animated films about friendship
1997 comedy films
1990s children's animated films
1990s English-language films